The Trans-Andean Highway (official designation Troncal 7, official name Carretera Trasandina), was inaugurated on July 24, 1925. It is 1,539 km long. It runs through the Venezuelan states of Mérida, Trujillo and Táchira, from the proximities of Agua Viva up until San Cristóbal.
Its highest point is located on Collado del Cóndor, at 4,118 meters (13,510 ft), making it the highest highway in Venezuela.

History
The highway was built as part of the national road plan passed by the government of former President Juan Vicente Gómez.  A significant number of prisoners were involved in its construction. The road had a big impact because for the first time it connected the Andean states of Venezuela with the rest of the country and facilitated, among other things, the ability of military forces to deal with rebellions which affected the area.

References

Road transport in Venezuela
Roads in Venezuela